PGG Wrightson Limited is an agricultural supply business based in New Zealand.  It was created in 2005 through the merger of Pyne Gould Guinness Ltd and Wrightson Limited and has its roots in a number of stock and station agencies dating back to 1861. It is one of the major suppliers to the agricultural sector in New Zealand providing products such as seeds, grains, livestock, irrigation, farm equipment, insurance and financing. Although publicly listed in New Zealand on the NZX, PGG Wrightson has been majority owned by Chinese-based Agria Corporation (GRO, NYSE) since 2011.

History
The result of mergers within the stock and station agency industry in New Zealand, PGG Wrightson can trace its obvious ancestry back to 1861, with the establishment of Wright Stephenson & Co.

Notable stock and station agencies that have merged to form PGG Wrightson include

PGG Wrightson 2005
Wrightson NMA 1972
 Wright Stephenson & Co
 National Mortgage and Agency Company of New Zealand, which had taken over Russell Le Cren and Company, and Russell Ritchie and Company and Murray Roberts & Co
 Levin & Co 1896
 Wairarapa Farmer's Co-operative Association
Dalgety Crown 1983 bought by Wrightson NMA 1986
Dalgety New Zealand Loan 1962
 New Zealand Loan and Mercantile Agency Company
 Dalgety New Zealand
 Crown Consolidated merged with Dalgety 1983
Pyne Gould Guinness
 Pyne & Co. Founded by FH Pyne.
 Gould Beaumont & Co. founded in 1851 by Joseph Gould, George Gould and John Beaumont
 Guinness & Le Cren Ltd, founded in 1890 by Edwin Rowland Guinness and Ernest Alfred le Cren
 Reid Farmers merged with PGG 2001
 Williams & Kettle, bought by Wrightson 2005

In 2011 PGG Wrightson sold its finance division to Heartland Building Society to create a single larger rural financing organisation.

In August 2018, it was announced that PGG had agreed to sell their Seeds business, PGW Seeds, to Danish company DLF Seeds for NZD $421 million. Although the deal is still subject to approval from the New Zealand Overseas Investment Office, it is expected to go through in early 2019. PGG Wrightson Seeds Holdings has operations in New Zealand, Australia, and South America. Under the deal, PGW and PGW Seeds will enter into a long-term distribution agreement for seed and grain. PGW will grant a brand licence to PGW Seeds for the continued use of the PGG Wrightson Seeds brand.

PGG Wrightson Country Cup
The PGG Wrightson Country Cup is the Premier Competition over the region known as the Canterbury Country. The region includes clubs from the Ellesmere and North Canterbury Sub-Unions and the Mid Canterbury Rugby Football Union.

Notable people
 Craig Norgate: Chairman of PGG Wrightson (and predecessor businesses) (2004–2009)
 Tim Miles: CEO of PGG Wrightson (2008–2010) and former Vodafone UK CEO  
 George Gould: CEO of PGG Wrightson (2010–2013) 
 Sir John Anderson: Chairman of PGG Wrightson (2010–2013)

References

New Zealand stock and station agencies
Companies listed on the New Zealand Exchange
New Zealand companies established in 2005
Transport companies established in 2005
Agriculture companies established in 2005